In Montana, TRAILS (Treasure State Academic Information & Library Services) is a statewide consortium of academic libraries which includes all 23 of Montana's public, private and tribal community colleges and universities. TRAILS serves over 49,500 students, faculty, researchers and community members, providing access to over 4,000,000 library items. The consortium is expected to save seven million dollars over a five-year period. TRAILS maximizes the return on resource investment, enhances teaching and research, improves the user experience, and encourages shared expertise among members of institutions across the state.

History 
In May 2014, Montana State University Library dean Kenning Arlitsch and University of Montana IT head and library system administrator John Greer proposed a unified content management system for Montana's academic libraries to the university's board of regents. The proposal was accepted unanimously. That year, funding was requested from the Montana Legislature. Although no legislative funding was awarded, the consortium officially launched in 2016 with the aims of increasing efficiency and improving access to resources for the students, researchers, and communities of Montana. By negotiating with vendors for consortium members, TRAILS provides students and faculty with access to journals, databases, and other resources which might not otherwise have been affordable. In addition to sharing resources and negotiating better prices for materials, in 2017 the consortium negotiated the purchase of the Alma cloud-based library-services platform from Ex Libris Ltd which increases efficiency and resource-sharing (allowing users to search 17 libraries in the system simultaneously). TRAILS, with support from the Montana Office of the Commissioner of Higher Education, has initiated a statewide program for open educational resources (OER) program, such as free online textbooks. The Northwest Commission on Colleges and Universities praised the Montana State University Library's leadership of the TRAILS program in 2017, and the MSU Library was named the 2018 Library of the Year by the Montana Library Association. The consortium consists of 24 institutions across the state. TRAILS includes all institutions in the Montana University System (MUS), the state's seven tribal colleges, and four private colleges. A memorandum of understanding was finalized by September 9, 2017, and operating procedures were approved on January 22, 2018. TRAILS is governed by a general council, which includes one representative of each institution. Officers include a chairperson and secretary, who serve two-year terms. Ex officio, non-voting representatives include the TRAILS coordinator and a representative of the Montana state librarian. Since the consortium's inception, its coordinator has been Pamela Benjamin. TRAILS has five standing committees (collection development, digital preservation, OverDrive, open educational resources and professional development) and five technology sub-committees: cataloging, discovery, e-resources, fulfillment and resource sharing.

Member institutions 

 Aaniiih Nakoda College
 Blackfeet Community College
 Carroll College
 Chief Dull Knife College
 Dawson Community College
 Flathead Valley Community College
 Fort Peck Community College
 Great Falls College Montana State University
 Helena College - University of Montana
 Little Big Horn College
 Miles Community College
 Montana State Library
 Montana State University – Bozeman
 Montana State University – Billings
 Montana State University – Northern
 Salish Kootenai College
 Stone Child College
 Rocky Mountain College
 University of Montana – Law Library
 University of Montana – Missoula Maureen and Mike Mansfield Library 
 University of Montana – Montana Tech
 University of Montana – Western
 University of Providence
 Yellowstone Christian College

Notes

External links 
 Official Website

Library consortia in Montana
Montana State University
University of Montana